"Dirty Diana" is a song by American singer-songwriter Michael Jackson. It is the ninth track on Jackson's seventh studio album, Bad (1987). The song was released by Epic Records on April 18, 1988, as the fifth single from the album. It presents a harder rock sound similar to "Beat It" from Thriller (1982) and a guitar solo played by Steve Stevens. "Dirty Diana" was written and co-produced by Jackson, and produced by Quincy Jones. The song's lyrics pertain to groupies. "Dirty Diana" has a moderate tempo and is played in the key of G minor.

"Dirty Diana" received mixed reviews from contemporary music critics, but was a commercial success worldwide in 1988, charting at No. 1 on the United States Billboard Hot 100. The song also charted within the top ten in multiple countries, including the United Kingdom, France, Italy, and New Zealand. In 2009, after Jackson's death in June, the song re-entered charts, mainly due to digital download sales. A music video for "Dirty Diana" was filmed in front of a live audience and released in 1988.

Background
"Dirty Diana" was written by Michael Jackson. It was produced by Quincy Jones and Michael Jackson. It appeared on Jackson's seventh studio album, Bad. The song was released by Epic Records on April 18, 1988, as the fifth single from Bad. After "Beat It", "Dirty Diana" was the second hard rock song of his solo career with lyrics about a persistent groupie. Jackson hired Billy Idol's guitarist Steve Stevens to back him on the track.

Initial reports at the time suggested the song was a poke at his close friend Diana Ross. However, it was later denied. In fact, Ross started using the song as an overture at her concerts shortly before appearing on stage. In an interview from the special edition of Bad, Jones later confirmed that the song's lyrics were about groupies. Jackson also confirmed the same during an interview with Barbara Walters, adding that it was not about Diana, Princess of Wales, though he was told personally by the Princess that it was her favorite among his songs.

Composition
Musically, "Dirty Diana" is a pop rock and hard rock song similar to "Beat It", with elements of heavy metal. TriniTrent of The Lava Lizard, when talking about Michael and Janet Jackson's "Scream", evokes "Dirty Diana" along with Jackson's "pop/rock musical direction" he has previously experimented with. John Tatlock of The Quietus regards the song as an attempt to recreate "the pop-rock alchemy of 'Beat It'." In his Bad review, Los Angeles Times Richard Cromelin describes "Dirty Diana" as a hard rock song, writing, "'Dirty Diana' is trying to be this year's 'Beat It' — a hard-rock song about a tenacious groupie that's sent into orbit by a Steve Stevens guitar solo."

Jon Pareles, a writer for The New York Times, viewed "Dirty Diana" as a song about a "groupie who latches onto the narrator, mixes the sexual fears of 'Billie Jean' with the hard-rock lead guitar of 'Beat It'." In his Bad review, Thom Duffy, music critic for the Orlando Sentinel, wrote that "Dirty Diana, a tale of a maliciously seductive fan, finds Jackson doing credible heavy-metal rock wailing," which, the critic said, was "accompanied by a solo from Steve Stevens, the guitarist from Billy Idol's band." Jonathan Takiff of The Philadelphia Inquirer also noted elements of heavy metal in "Dirty Diana", writing, "Plus, to tap the rock crowd (in the style of the 'Thriller' crossover smash 'Beat It' with Eddie Van Halen), Michael cut a heavy metal-tinged 'Dirty Diana' featuring Billy Idol's guitar sizzler Stevie Stevens." "Dirty Diana" is written in common time and moves at a moderate tempo of 131 beats per minute. Jackson's vocals are sung on a range of B3 to G5. The instrumentation consists of guitar and piano and is played in the key of G minor.

Reception

Critical response
"Dirty Diana" received mixed reviews by contemporary music critics. Stephen Thomas Erlewine felt that "Dirty Diana" and "Man in the Mirror" were "showcasing Jackson at his worst" on Bad. Music critic Robert Christgau viewed "Dirty Diana" as "misogynistic as any piece of metal suck-my-cock." Jon Pareles described "Dirty Diana" as 'reducing' Jackson to a "terrified whimper," while John Tatlock considered "Dirty Diana" as a "confused lumbering slog of a song," thinking that "Jackson was never convincing in this kind of role, a boy-child trying to write a song about the kind of woman he never meets in the kind of places he's certainly never been to." Davitt Sigerson of Rolling Stone gave the song a more positive review; though calling it a "filler," she still commented that the song, along with "Speed Demon," is what makes Bad "richer, sexier, better than Thrillers forgettables." Sigerson noted that "Dirty Diana" was a "substantial recording" because of its "insubstantial melody." Jennifer Clay of Yahoo! Music commented that while Jackson's edgier image was a "little hard to swallow," the image, musically, worked on the songs "Bad", "Man in the Mirror", and "Dirty Diana", but was not "to the degree of Thriller."

Chart performance
"Dirty Diana", similar to Bads previous singles, charted within the top 20 and top 10 worldwide. It peaked at No. 1 on the United States Billboard Hot 100 on July 2, 1988, after nine weeks on the chart, and exited the chart after its 14th week. Internationally, "Dirty Diana" charted within the top 30 positions on several music charts. It charted within the top five in the Netherlands, Germany, and New Zealand, peaking at Nos. 2, 3 and 5, respectively. It entered the United Kingdom charts on July 16, 1988, at No. 14 and the following week went to No. 4, where it stayed for two weeks.

"Dirty Diana" peaked at No. 3 in Ireland, No. 7 in Austria and No. 9 in France. It peaked at No. 30 in Australia. Following Jackson's death in June 2009, his music experienced a surge in popularity. In July 2009, "Dirty Diana" saw a strong chart surge, mainly due to digital download sales. The song charted at No. 18 on the French Digital Singles Chart on July 4, 2009. On July 12, the song peaked at No. 13 on the Swiss Singles Chart. "Dirty Diana" re-entered the United Kingdom charts on July 4, 2009, at No. 50 and the following week peaked at No. 26.

Music video
The five-minute music video for the song was directed by Joe Pytka and produced by Larry Stessel. The music video was filmed in March 1988 in Long Beach, California. It won the "Number-One Video in the World" at the first World Music Awards held on April 14, 1989. It is featured on the DVD albums Number Ones, Michael Jackson's Vision, and the Target version DVD of Bad 25.

The woman who appears in the video is model Lisa Dean, chosen over hundreds of girls who auditioned for the role.

Live performance video
A second seven-minute long accompanying video of a live performance (which should not be confused with the actual music video) was filmed in early 1988 in front of a live audience during Jackson's show in Madison Square Garden (Steve Stevens playing guitar). The video starts with the screen saying "Pepsi Presents Michael Jackson Tour 1988" in front of a white background for forty seconds. After showing a black screen, Jackson can be seen from a distance performing in front of an audience with the only source of light being blue lights. During Jackson's performance he is dressed in a white button down shirt, black pants and has metal and leather belts on his pants while singing and dancing. In between Jackson's performance from a distance, there are clips of him performing up-close while singing into a microphone, as well as clips of his guitarist Jennifer Batten performing behind him. Jackson then begins dancing and singing to the woman before walking down a cat-walk and dancing near guitarist Steve Stevens. Jackson's performance is then shown from a distance again and the video ends with Jackson finishing his performance and the lights turning blue.

Live performances
"Dirty Diana" was performed during Jackson's Bad World Tour concert series from 1987 to 1989, but only in the second leg, as the 10th song in the setlist. According to Jackson in an interview with Barbara Walters, "Dirty Diana" was scheduled for a live 1988 performance at Wembley Stadium during the Bad World Tour; however, Jackson felt the song would be an insult to Diana, Princess of Wales, who was in attendance, so he had it removed. After Diana informed him the song was actually one of her personal favorites, Jackson re-added the song to the set list. This performance can be seen on the DVD Michael Jackson: Live at Wembley July 16, 1988. This Is It concert series choreographer, Kenny Ortega, stated in an interview that "Dirty Diana" was going to be performed by Jackson for the concerts from 2009 to 2010. Ortega said that Jackson had planned to rehearse the song before he died. The set up for the song would include an expert pole dancer who would lure Jackson onto a giant steel bed on which she performed acrobatic feats.

Track listing

7-inch single, 12-inch maxi
"Dirty Diana" – 4:42
"Dirty Diana" (instrumental) – 4:42

3-inch CD single
"Dirty Diana" (single edit) – 4:42
"Dirty Diana" (instrumental) – 4:42
"Dirty Diana" (album version) – 4:52

CD-maxi single
"Dirty Diana" – 4:42
"Dirty Diana" (instrumental) – 4:42
"Bad" (Dance Extended Mix Includes False Fade) – 8:24

CD side
"Dirty Diana" – 4:40
"Dirty Diana" (instrumental) – 4:40

DVD side
"Dirty Diana (music video) – 5:08

Credits and personnel

Written and composed by Michael Jackson
Produced by Quincy Jones
Co-produced by Michael Jackson
Michael Jackson – solo and background vocals, Clave' clapstick
Rhythm arrangement by Michael Jackson, John Barnes and Jerry Hey
Synthesizer arrangements by Michael Jackson, Quincy Jones and John Barnes
String arrangement by John Barnes
Vocal arrangement by Michael Jackson

John Robinson – drums
Douglas Getschal – drum programming
Paul Jackson, Jr. and David Williams – guitars
Christopher Currell – Synclavier
Denny Jaeger – Synclavier synthesis 
John Barnes, Michael Boddicker and Randy Waldman – synthesizers
Steve Stevens – guitar solo

Charts

Weekly charts

Year-end charts

Certifications

See also
List of Billboard Hot 100 number-one singles of 1988
List of Cash Box Top 100 number-one singles of 1988
List of European number-one hits of 1988
List of number-one hits of 1988 (Flanders)
List of number-one singles of 2006 (Spain)

References

Bibliography

Songs about groupies
1987 songs
1988 singles
Epic Records singles
Michael Jackson songs
American hard rock songs
American pop rock songs
Billboard Hot 100 number-one singles
Cashbox number-one singles
European Hot 100 Singles number-one singles
Number-one singles in Spain
Ultratop 50 Singles (Flanders) number-one singles
Songs written by Michael Jackson
Song recordings produced by Michael Jackson
Song recordings produced by Quincy Jones